Alexandre "Álex" dos Santos Ferreira (born 15 January 1999) is a Brazilian footballer who last played as a goalkeeper for Spanish club Getafe CF B.

Club career

Atlético Madrid
Born in Xinguara, Pará, dos Santos was raised in Extremadura, and joined Atlético Madrid's youth setup in 2011, from Don Benito Balompié AD. On 21 August 2013, while still a youth, he signed a new five-year contract with the club.

Promoted to the reserves for the 2018–19 season, dos Santos made his senior debut on 23 September 2018, starting in a 4–2 Segunda División B away win against CDA Navalcarnero. The following 8 February, he extended his contract until 2022, but spent the most of the campaign as a backup to Miguel San Román.

dos Santos became a regular starter in 2019–20 after San Román left, but the season was curtailed due to the COVID-19 pandemic.

Lokomotiva
On 20 August 2020, dos Santos moved to Croatian side NK Lokomotiva as a part of Ivo Grbić's transfer to Atlético; his former side also retained 40% over a future sale. He made his professional debut on 13 September, playing the full 90 minutes of a 1–2 home loss against HNK Gorica for the Croatian First Football League championship.

Honours
Atlético Madrid
UEFA Super Cup: 2018

Personal life
Born in Brazil, dos Santos also holds Spanish nationality.

References

External links

1999 births
Living people
Sportspeople from Pará
Brazilian footballers
Spanish footballers
Association football goalkeepers
Segunda División B players
Atlético Madrid B players
Getafe CF B players
Croatian Football League players
NK Lokomotiva Zagreb players
Brazilian expatriate footballers
Brazilian expatriate sportspeople in Croatia
Expatriate footballers in Croatia